Timaru Girls' High School is a secondary school in Timaru, New Zealand, founded in 1880. Timaru Girls' High provides education for girls aged between 13 – 18 years of age (class levels - years 9 to 13). It also has a boarding facility within the school grounds for pupils not living in Timaru itself and also caters for international students. The school motto is Scientia Potestas Est – Knowledge is Power. The school is a stone's throw away from the Catholic Roncalli College.

Houses
The school has 4 colour houses named after New Zealand native flowers and each student is put into one of them to encourage team spirit.
The colours are:
Yellow = Kowhai
Blue   = Konini
Green  = Ngaio
Red    = Rata
There are several House events per year, Swimming Sports, Athletics, Cross Country, Aitkens and Waters Cup Day and House Choirs

Notable alumnae
Maria Fahey – cricketer
Jo Goodhew – MP
Elizabeth Gunn – paediatrician
Jean Hay – early childhood educator
Eva Hill – doctor

Controversy
In September 2011, a school girl wanted to support the country's Blue Friday, a nationwide campaign to raise awareness of prostate cancer. She was banned from supporting it because students were only allowed to support female causes, even though the girl's own grandfather had died from this cancer.  This raised issues in the newspapers

References

External links
Timaru Girl's High School Website

Boarding schools in New Zealand
Timaru
Educational institutions established in 1880
Girls' schools in New Zealand
Secondary schools in Canterbury, New Zealand
1880 establishments in New Zealand
Alliance of Girls' Schools Australasia